Yebra de Basa is a municipality located in the province of Huesca, Aragon, Spain. According to the 2004 census (INE), the municipality had a population of 166 inhabitants.

References

Municipalities in the Province of Huesca